A Cytomegalovirus vaccine is a vaccine to prevent cytomegalovirus (CMV) infection or curb virus re-activation (symptomatic flare-ups) in persons already infected. Challenges in developing a vaccine include adeptness of CMV in evading the immune system and limited animal models. As of 2018 no such vaccine exists, although a number of vaccine candidates are under investigation. They include recombinant protein, live attenuated, DNA and other vaccines.

As a member of the TORCH complex, cytomegalovirus can cause congenital infection, which can lead to neurological problems, vision and hearing loss. Infection/re-activation of CMV in immuno-compromised persons, including organ transplantation recipients, causes significant mortality and morbidity.  Additionally, CMV has strong associations with plaques found in atherosclerosis progression.   Because of all these, there has been considerable effort made towards the development of a vaccine, with particular emphasis on protection of pregnant women. Since vaccination of the immunocompromised persons introduces additional challenges, members of this population are less likely to be candidates for such a vaccine.

Additionally, there are additional health risks for individuals who are already not infected with CMV. For instance, CMV infection is strongly associated with development of Alzheimer's disease.

Development of such a vaccine has been emphasized as a priority by the National Vaccine Program Office in the United States.

Recombinant gB subunit vaccine
A phase 2 study of a recombinant gB protein subunit CMV-vaccine published in 2009 indicated an efficacy of 50% in seronegative women of childbearing age—thus the protection provided was limited and a number of subjects contracted CMV infection despite the vaccination. In one case congenital CMV was encountered.

Another phase 2 study of the same vaccine was done in patients awaiting kidney transplantation. The vaccine significantly boosted the antibody levels and reduced the duration of post-transplantation viremia.

Further research
In 2013, Astellas Pharma has started on individuals who received a hematopoietic stem cell transplant a Phase III trial with its CMV deoxyribonucleic acid DNA cytomegalovirus vaccine ASP0113.

In 2015, Astellas Pharma has commenced on healthy volunteers a Phase I trial with its cytomegalovirus vaccine ASP0113.

In 2016, VBI Vaccines commenced a Phase I preventative cytomegalovirus vaccine study (VBI-1501).

Other cytomegalovirus vaccines candidates are the CMV-MVA Triplex vaccine and the CMVpp65-A*0201 peptide vaccine. Both vaccine candidates are sponsored by the City of Hope National Medical Center. As of 2016, the development is in clinical phase 2 trial stage.

In March 2019, Helocyte and City of Hope National Medical Center announced positive phase two results for Triplex. They are working on finding funding for Phase III research and then FDA approval.

Moderna is working on a mRNA CMV vaccine.  It was the first mRNA vaccine to enter phase 2 clinical trials.

References

Vaccines